Gudivada Assembly constituency is a constituency in Krishna district of Andhra Pradesh, representing the state legislative assembly in India. It is one of the seven assembly segments of Machilipatnam (Lok Sabha constituency), along with Gannavaram, Pedana, Machilipatnam, Avanigadda, Pamarru SC and Penamaluru. , there are a total of 208,305 electors in the constituency. 

Kodali Sri Venkateswara Rao is the present MLA of Gudivada assembly constituency, who won the 2019 Andhra Pradesh Legislative Assembly election from YSR Congress Party.

Mandals 

The three mandals that form the assembly constituency are:

Member of Legislative Assembly

Election results

Assembly elections 1952

Assembly Elections 1999

Assembly Elections 2004

Assembly Elections 2009

Assembly elections 2014

Assembly Elections 2019

See also 
 List of constituencies of the Andhra Pradesh Legislative Assembly

References 

Assembly constituencies of Andhra Pradesh